My Dream is the only studio album by American R&B singer-songwriter Yvette Michele, released on Loud Records and RCA Records. My Dream peaked at number 46 on the US Billboards Top R&B/Hip-Hop Albums chart.

Track listing 
Credits adapted from liner notes.
 "Intro" 
 "The Way I Feel" (Steve Ivory, Michele Bryant)
 "Summer Love" (Alston Taylor, Michele Bryant, Bob James)
 "All I Really Want" (Rheji Burrell, Vincent Herbert)
 "Crazy" (Michele Bryant, Felicia Adams)
 "Everyday & Everynight" (Michele Bryant, Alston Taylor)
 "Let's Stay Together" (Full Force, Michele Bryant, Mashonda Tifrere, Shayisha Brown, Ricky Walters)
 "Only Wanna Be With You" (Steve Ivory, Michele Bryant, Wright)
 "Something in the Way (You Make Me Feel)" (Angela Winbush)
 "My Dreams" (Feldman, Ira Schickman, Osbourne Bingham, Raymond Calhoun, Charlie Wilson, Rudy Taylor)
 "The First Time" (Full Force, Michele Bryant, Alston Taylor, Michelob, Mashonda Tifrere)
 "So We Can Get Down (Yea Yea)" (Full Force, Mashonda Tifrere, Paul Richmond, Daryl Ellis, Ruben Locke)
 "I'm Not Feeling You" (Michele Bryant, Sylvester James, Harvey Fuqua, Michelob)
 "DJ Keep Playin' (Get Your Music On)" (Full Force, Lucien George III)
 "Outro"

Charts

References 

1997 debut albums
Contemporary R&B albums by American artists
RCA Records albums
Loud Records albums